Macksburg is a city in Madison County, Iowa, United States. The population was 97 at the time of the 2020 census. It is part of the Des Moines–West Des Moines Metropolitan Statistical Area.

Geography
Macksburg is located at  (41.214250, -94.185618).

History
Macksburg was laid out and platted in 1873. It was named for Dr. Joseph Hughes Mack, one of the original owners of the town site.

Demographics

2010 census
At the 2010 census there were 113 people in 53 households, including 33 families, in the city. The racial makup of the city was 96.5% White, 1.8% Native American, and 1.8% from two or more races.

Of the 53 households 28.3% had children under the age of 18 living with them, 47.2% were married couples living together, 9.4% had a female householder with no husband present, 5.7% had a male householder with no wife present, and 37.7% were non-families. 34.0% of households were one person and 11.3% were one person aged 65 or older. The average household size was 2.13 and the average family size was 2.76.

The median age was 44.4 years. 20.4% of residents were under the age of 18; 6.1% were between the ages of 18 and 24; 25.7% were from 25 to 44; 27.4% were from 45 to 64; and 20.4% were 65 or older. The gender makeup of the city was 52.2% male and 47.8% female.

2000 census
At the 2000 census there were 142 people in 62 households, including 40 families, in the city. The racial makup of the city was 97.18% White, 1.41% Asian, and 1.41% from two or more races.

Of the 62 households 29.0% had children under the age of 18 living with them, 58.1% were married couples living together, 4.8% had a female householder with no husband present, and 33.9% were non-families. 32.3% of households were one person and 14.5% were one person aged 65 or older. The average household size was 2.29 and the average family size was 2.76.

The age distribution was 26.8% under the age of 18, 6.3% from 18 to 24, 20.4% from 25 to 44, 28.2% from 45 to 64, and 18.3% 65 or older. The median age was 38 years. For every 100 females, there were 89.3 males. For every 100 females age 18 and over, there were 96.2 males.

The median household income was $31,500 and the median family income  was $36,964. Males had a median income of $29,688 versus $20,357 for females. The per capita income for the city was $14,080. There were none of the families and 5.6% of the population living below the poverty line, including no under eighteens and 6.5% of those over 64.

Education
Orient-Macksburg Community School District operates area public schools.

Notable people 
 Glenn L. Martin, American aviator and founder of the Glenn L. Martin Company, which is now part of the Lockheed Martin Corporation.

References

Gallery

Cities in Iowa
Cities in Madison County, Iowa
Des Moines metropolitan area
1873 establishments in Iowa